Alfonso Santillán Fajardo, O.P. (died 15 Oct 1620) was a Roman Catholic prelate who served as Bishop of Quito (1616–1620).

Biography
Alfonso Santillán Fajardo was ordained a priest in the Order of Preachers. On 23 Mar 1616, he was appointed during the papacy of Pope Paul V as Bishop of Quito. He served as Bishop of Quito until his death on 15 Oct 1620.

References

External links and additional sources
 (for Chronology of Bishops) 
 (for Chronology of Bishops) 

17th-century Roman Catholic bishops in Ecuador
Bishops appointed by Pope Paul V
Dominican bishops
1620 deaths
Roman Catholic bishops of Quito